The siege of Gana was a twenty-day siege by a German army led by King Henry the Fowler against a Slavic Glomacze fortification, that took place in early 929 at the fort of Gana, named so after the nearby Jahna river.

In early 929, King Henry led a campaign along his realm's eastern frontier against a multitude of Slavic forts. After capturing his first target at Brandenburg, he seized several more Slavic forts in the area and constructed German ones to establish and secure German control over the territory. A powerful Glomacze fort at Gana near modern-day Stauchitz was Henry's second primary target of the campaign. Henry's army took the fort after expending at least 110,000 man-hours of labour filling in a section of the ditch that protected it. Upon conquest of the stronghold, the Glomacze garrison was exterminated on Henry's orders and the young boys and girls in the fort were enslaved to Henry's milites professional soldiers.

The siege and the subsequent establishment of a German fort at Meissen guaranteed permanent German dominance along the middle Elbe river and led to the creation of the Marca Geronis to maintain the conquests. The siege at Gana, combined with the large number of sieges in the rest of Henry's 929 campaign, show the considerable resources that could be mobilized by the German kingdom for extended warfare to conquer, control and annex territory.

Background  
In the winter of 928, King Henry the Fowler of Germany organized a military expedition along his eastern frontier against various Slavic fortifications. His first objective was the Hevelli tribe's princely seat Brandenburg, located along the Havel river. The Germans reduced Hevelli military power through a multitude of battles, before closing in on the Brandenburg fortress and capturing it by a storm. Upon occupation of the fort, Henry proceeded to take over all of Hevelli territory. The next German campaign target was the Glomacze fortress of Gana near the Jahna river. On their way to Gana, Henry's army marched along the Plane valley to the Fläming hills, conquering more Slavic forts at Belzig, Mörz, Niemegk and Zahna. Nearby, German forts were constructed in 929 at Strehla, controlling a ford over the Elbe, at Osterburg and at Dahlen, securing the area.

Siege
Archaeological excavations have uncovered a fortress in the Jahna river valley near Stauchitz that may be identified with the Gana site. The fort had walls 15 meters thick at their foundation and with a height of 6 meters. It was enclosed by a 15-meter wide and 5-meter tall ditch. The circuit of the walls was 700 meters long and the fort encompassed an area of 4 hectares, not including a possible outer fort. 

Filling in a 200-meter section of the ditch was necessary for Henry's men to storm the walls, a process that would have required the excavation of 15,000 tons of earth with at least 50,000 man-hours of work. The earth then needed to be transported and unloaded on the ditch using wagons. At least 750 carts and 30,000 wagon-loads of earth would have been needed, requiring another 60,000 man-hours of loading, transport and unloading. With only 8 hours of daylight in the winter, it would have taken 1,000 men two weeks to accomplish the task.

Once Gana was stormed at the end of the 20-day siege, Henry gave the order for his men to kill all the defenders and enslave the young boys and girls to his milites professional soldiers. Given the ferocity of the German conquest, it is likely they had sustained heavy losses in the assault. Bachrach estimates more than 1,000 Germans killed or wounded, based on a mathematical siege attack model for the Brandenburg fortification.

Aftermath
After conquering Gana, Henry marched up the Elbe to accomplish his ultimate campaign aim, the siege of Prague and the subjugation of Duke Wenceslaus I's Duchy of Bohemia. Along the way, he constructed a fortress at Meissen, as proven by dendrochronological dating of the wooden construction at Meissen, which establishes an early building stage for 929. Meissen secured German control over the middle Elbe and was followed by the establishment of the Marca Geronis to maintain the German hold. With the help of Duke Arnulf of Bavaria's troops, Henry invaded Bohemia with a total force of 12,000–15,000 professional soldiers and expeditionary militia levies and compelled the surrender of heavily-fortified Prague, concluding a highly successful campaign.

Analysis
The extensive and successful German siege operations over some period of time show that Henry and the German kingdom could mobilize thousands of soldiers and supply them with the transport animals, food and fodder necessary to maintain them.

Citations

Bibliography
 

929
Gana
Gana
Gana